Ilija Bozoljac chose to not defend his 2008 title.
1st-seeded Daniel Gimeno-Traver defeated 6th-seeded Julian Reister 6–4, 6–1 in the final.

Seeds

Draw

Final four

Top half

Bottom half

References
 Main Draw
 Qualifying Draw

Banja Luka Challenger - Singles
2009 Singles